Henry C. Bottum (June 7, 1826 – May 23, 1913) was a farmer, American politician and member of the Wisconsin State Assembly.

Biography
Bottum was born on June 7, 1826, in Orwell, Vermont, the son of Roswell Bottum and Elue Hulburd Bottum. He married Helen Burnham on July 21, 1852. Bottum later became a farmer in Fond du Lac County, Wisconsin. He died on May 23, 1913, in West Rosendale, Wisconsin.

His father Roswell Bottum served in the Vermont House of Representatives. A son, Joseph, became a member of the South Dakota Senate. Joseph's son, Joseph H. Bottum, served as Lieutenant Governor of South Dakota and in the United States Senate. Writer Joseph Bottum and musician Roddy Bottum are great-great-grandsons of Henry.

Assembly career
Bottum served three terms as a member of the Assembly during the 1868, 1869 and 1879 sessions. He was a Republican.

References

Notes

External links

People from Orwell, Vermont
People from Fond du Lac County, Wisconsin
Republican Party members of the Wisconsin State Assembly
Farmers from Wisconsin
1826 births
1913 deaths
Burials in Wisconsin
19th-century American politicians